Option Grid  is the name for a tool for patients and providers to use together when they are discussing and deciding what best to do about possible options, either treatments or tests. The grid is published in the form of a summary table to enable comparisons between multiple potential treatments or options. The grids do this by using questions that patients frequently ask (FAQs), and are designed for use in face-to-face clinical encounters or to be given to patients to read for a few minutes, ahead of a conversation with a provider.

The key to the grids is the use of frequently asked questions (FAQs) that relate to the most common or most important concerns of patients. It is important to choose these FAQs carefully and to limit them to those that can be considered briefly. These FAQs are based on evidence where possible, and final versions are developed by teams of patients, clinicians, and editors. All Grids are written at a reading level of 10–12 years, in accordance with the plain English campaign guides. The evidence summaries upon which Option Grids are based are available for public review at the official Option Grid website.

Published option grids
A number of option grids exist including:

Cancer
 Lumpectomy with radiotherapy vs. mastectomy for breast cancer (English & Spanish) 
 Surgery to remove the ovaries and fallopian tubes vs. no surgery for ovarian cancer risk before menopause (English) 
 Surgery to remove the ovaries and fallopian tubes vs. no surgery forovarian cancer risk after menopause (English)

Cardiac 
 Implant an implantable cardioverter defibrillator (ICD) and continue to use medication vs. continue to use medication but do not implant an ICD for patients with heart failure (English) 
 Optimal medical treatment vs. angioplasty (stenting) for stable angina (English & Spanish) 
 Dabigatran vs. warfarin for stroke prevention with non-valvular atrial fibrillation (English)

Crohn's Disease
 Immunomodulator vs. anti-TNF vs. combination therapy for Crohn’s disease (English)

Epilepsy
 Continuing medical treatment without surgery vs. brain surgery, for hippocampal sclerosis in temporal lobe epilepsy (English) 
 Sodium valproate (Epilim) vs. Levetiracetam (Keppra) vs. Lamotrigine (Lamictal) for epilepsy treatments when considering pregnancy (English)

Kidney Disease
 Peritoneal dialysis (CAPD/APD) vs. haemodialysis at the hospital vs. haemodialysis at home vs. transplantation vs. conservative management for chronic kidney disease (English & Spanish)

Mental Health
 Continuing to stay off paid work vs. taking steps to return to paid work with the help of an employment specialist (English)

Osteoarthritis
 Non-operative treatment vs. hip replacement surgery for osteoarthritis of the hip (English) 
 Painkillers vs. joint injections (steroids) vs. knee replacement surgery for managing knee pain and activity level in osteoarthritis of the knee (English) 
 Lifestyle and weight loss vs. medication for self-management of osteoarthritis of the knee (English and Spanish)

Other
 Managing without injections or surgery vs. injections (epidural steroids) vs. surgery for sciatica from a herniated disc (English) 
 Treatment with antibiotics vs. treatment without antibiotics for a sore throat (English)

Pediatric/Neonatal Health
 Circumcision vs. no circumcision for newborn boy (English)
 Grommets (tympanostomy tubes) vs. hearing aid vs. active observation for glue ear (serous otitis media) in child (English) 
 Tonsillectomy vs. active management for tonsillitis in children under 16 (English and Spanish)

Women's & Reproductive Health
 Having amniocentesis vs. not having amniocentesis for testing for Down’s Syndrome in pregnancy (English & Spanish) 
 Having Down syndrome screening vs. not having Down syndrome screening in pregnancy (English & Spanish) 
 Medication (no hormones) vs. hormonal medication vs. removing the uterus lining vs. removing fibroids vs. removing the uterus for heavy menstrual bleeding (English)

Collaborative
The Option Grid Collaborative is a not-for-profit group of over 90 people, made up of patient representatives, medical experts, and clinicians involved in supporting shared decision making via the creation of Option Grids. The Collaborative welcomes new members who wish to create new Option Grids according to the group’s agreed-upon process, which involves a thorough review of best available evidence and user testing process. Interested members should visit the Official Website in the links below for more information about how to get involved. Collaborative members receive support and guidance for Option Grid development from Dartmouth College throughout the process.

Creative Commons license
The Collaborative operates under a Creative Commons license, which is a type of public copyright license that enables authors to give others the right to collaborate and build upon their work according to guidelines specified by the author. The Collaborative’s specific license, CC-BY-NC-ND, allows others to download the group’s work and share it so long as they credit the source, do not make changes, and do not use it commercially.

See also
 Decision aids 
 Shared decision making 
 Patient participation

References

External links

video example of how Option Grid might be used

Health care